Julie McDonald may refer to:

 Julie McDonald (swimmer, born 1952), Australian Olympic swimmer
 Julie McDonald (swimmer, born 1970), Australian Olympic swimmer
 Julie McDonald (agent) (born 1954), American talent agent
 Julie Jensen McDonald (1929–2013), American author and educator

See also
Julie MacDonald (disambiguation)